Valentin Vital'yevich Rumyantsev (ru: Валенти́н Вита́льевич Румя́нцев) (19 July 1921, Novaya Skatovka, Saratov region — 10 June 2007, Moscow) was a Russian engineer and control theorist who played a crucial role in Soviet space program. He was a member of the Russian Academy of Sciences (1992), Department of Engineering, Mechanics and Control.

Career 
Rumyantsev was professor in the Faculty of Mechanics and Mathematics in the Department of Theoretical Mechanics and Mecatronics at Moscow State University. He was editor of the Journal of Applied Mathematics and Mechanics. Rumyantsev was also a corresponding member (1995) and member (2000) of the International Academy of Astronautics (France, Paris).

References

1921 births
2007 deaths
Early spaceflight scientists
Corresponding Members of the USSR Academy of Sciences
Full Members of the Russian Academy of Sciences
Russian aerospace engineers
Soviet engineers
Soviet space program personnel
Academic staff of Moscow State University
Control theorists
Foreign members of the Serbian Academy of Sciences and Arts